The knockout stage of the UEFA Women's Euro 2013 was a single-elimination style tournament contested by the eight teams advancing from the group stage of the competition. It began on 21 July 2013 with the quarter-final round, and concluded on 28 July 2013 with the final at the Friends Arena, Solna, to determine the champions.

In the knockout stage (including the final), if a match was level at the end of 90 minutes, extra time of two periods (15 minutes each) was played. If the score was still level after extra time, the match was decided by a penalty shootout.

Qualified teams

Bracket

All times are local (UTC+2)

Quarter-finals

Sweden vs Iceland

Italy vs Germany

Norway vs Spain

France vs Denmark

Semi-finals

Sweden vs Germany

Norway vs Denmark

Final

References

External links

Knockout stage
knock
knock
knock
2013 in Icelandic football
knock
Knock
2013–14 in Spanish women's football
Knock